Copy may refer to:

Copying or the product of copying (including the plural "copies"); the duplication of information or an artifact
Cut, copy and paste, a method of reproducing text or other data in computing
File copying
Photocopying, a process which makes paper copies of documents and other visual images
Fax, a telecommunications technology used to transfer facsimile copies of documents, especially over the telephone network
Facsimile, a copy or reproduction that is as true to the original source as possible
Replica, a copy closely resembling the original concerning its shape and appearance
Term of art in U.S. copyright law meaning a material object in which a work of authorship has been embodied, such as a book
 Copy (command), a shell command on DOS and Windows systems
Copy (publishing), written content in publications, in contrast to photographs or other elements of layout. 
The output of journalists and authors, ready for copy editing and typesetting
The output of copywriters, who are employed to write material which encourages consumers to buy goods or services.
Camera ready copy, term used in the commercial printing industry meaning that a document is, from a technical standpoint, ready to "go to press", or be printed.
Copy (album), the debut album of the electronica artist Mitsuki Aira
Copy (musician), the Portland-based electronic music artist
"Copy", a procedure word or response indicating a satisfactory receipt of the last radio transmission
COPY, a COBOL keyword

See also 
 Copy and paste (disambiguation)
 Copyist
 Copyright
Copy editing
 Duplication (disambiguation)